Women's League for Conservative Judaism (WLCJ) is the national representative body in the United States for women within Conservative Judaism.

Overview 
The WLCJ was founded by Mathilde Schechter in 1918, originally named as the National Women’s League of the United Synagogue. The vision of the organization was to serve as the coordinating body for Conservative synagogue sisterhoods.

References 

Conservative Judaism in the United States
Jewish women's organizations
Jewish organizations established in 1918